This is a list of home video releases for the stop motion animated television series Pingu.

Japan

United States
In the US, Pingu was released on DVD on five single-disc sets from 2003 onwards. Although the original episodes are contained, there are some omissions:
 The original versions are not included in the sets, due to HiT Entertainment lending the remastered versions instead of the old versions.
 Some controversial episodes, most notably "Little Accidents/Pingu's Lavatory Story", which was banned everywhere except the UK and Canada, are not included in the sets due to their perceived offensive material. 
 However, the frequently banned episodes "Pingu Runs Away from Home" and "Pingu Dreams" are present on the Antarctic Antics compilation.
No episodes from seasons 3 or 4 are on the DVDs, but on the Antarctic Antics US tape, there is one season 3 episode, "Pingu's Long Journey". Many episodes from Seasons 3 and 4 have been included on VOD exclusive releases . Antarctic Antics was released on DVD, but is very hard to find on DVD, although it is easier to find in Canada.

(VHS) Pingu Breaks the Ice
Date: 2004

(DVD) Chillin with Pingu (Includes Pingu Breaks the Ice!)
Date: 2005

(DVD) 4 Feature Set
Date: March 8, 2011

United Kingdom
Notes -
 For the UK VHS tapes and DVDs listed below, those that were released up to 2001 were released by the BBC, all the subsequent ones were released by HIT Entertainment from 2003.
 The UK VHS tapes produced by the BBC cover all the episodes of series 1, 2 and 3 (except for episodes 1.21 “Pingu’s Dream”, and 3.8 “Pingu and the Mother Bird” for unknown reasons), but none from series 4. The VHS tapes / DVDs released up to 2013 by HIT for the UK market cover thirty-four episodes of the 78 in series 1, 2 and 3, four episodes of the 26 in series 4, all fifty-two of the episodes for seasons 5 and 6, and the “wedding” special episode.
 BBC Video (1991–2001)
 HIT Entertainment (2003–2013)

VHS tape list

DVD (region 2) list

Lists of home video releases